Biendongella is a genus of fish in the subfamily Gobionellinae native to the South China Sea. The generic name is formed by adding the diminutive suffix ella to the Vietnamese name for the South China Sea, Bien Dong.

Species
There are currently 2 recognized species in this genus:
 Biendongella hemilissa Prokofiev, 2015 
 Biendongella iljini Prokofiev, 2015

References

Amblyopinae